Alessio Curci (born 16 February 2002) is a Luxembourgian footballer who plays as a forward for Mainz 05 II.

Club career
As a youth player, Curci joined the youth academy of Luxembourgian fourth tier side Steinfort. In 2018, he joined the youth academy of Eintracht Trier in the German fourth tier after receiving offers from the youth academies of French Ligue 1 club PSG and Milan in the Italian Serie A.

In 2020, he joined the youth academy of German Bundesliga team Mainz 05.

Career statistics

Scores and results list Luxembourg's goal tally first, score column indicates score after each Curci goal.

References

External links
 

Living people
2002 births
Luxembourgian footballers
Association football forwards
Luxembourg international footballers
Regionalliga players
1. FSV Mainz 05 II players
Luxembourgian expatriate footballers
Luxembourgian expatriate sportspeople in Germany
Expatriate footballers in Germany
Luxembourgian people of Italian descent